Kody Seti Kimbulu (born 23 January 1978), known professionally as Kody or Kody Kim, is a Belgian television host, comedian, and radio personality.

Kody was born in Schaerbeek, Belgium to a Congolese family. He attended the Catholic University of Louvain, studying both politics and business management. After graduation, he joined the theatre group Kings of Comedy and began working in the radio industry, hosting radio shows on VivaCité and RTBF. In 2014, he was featured in the fourth season of Laurent Ruquier's show On n'demande qu'à en rire on France 2.

He was a guest host for La Deux and C8 from 2015 to 2017. On 18 October 2019, it was announced that Kody would host the 10th Magritte Awards.

References

External links
 
 

1978 births
21st-century comedians
Belgian people of Democratic Republic of the Congo descent
Belgian male comedians
Belgian television presenters
Belgian radio presenters
Université catholique de Louvain alumni
Living people